A paleocontinent or palaeocontinent is a distinct area of continental crust that existed as a major landmass in the geological past. There have been many different landmasses throughout Earth's time. They range in sizes, some are just a collection of small microcontinents while others are large conglomerates of crust. As time progresses and sea levels rise and fall more crust can be exposed making way for larger landmasses. The continents of the past shaped the evolution of organisms on Earth and contributed to the climate of the globe as well. As landmasses break apart, species are separated and those that were once the same now have evolved to their new climate. The constant movement of these landmasses greatly determines the distribution of organisms on Earth's surface. This is evident with how similar fossils are found on completely separate continents. Also, as continents move, mountain building events (orogenies) occur, causing a shift in the global climate as new rock is exposed and then there is more exposed rock at higher elevations. This causes glacial ice expansion and an overall cooler global climate. Which effects the overall global climate trend of Earth. The movement of the continents greatly affects the overall dispersal of organisms throughout the world and the trend in climate throughout Earth's history. Examples include Laurentia, Baltica and Avalonia, which collided together during the Caledonian orogeny to form the Old Red Sandstone paleocontinent of Laurussia. Another example includes a collision that occurred during the late Pennsylvanian and early Permian time when there was a collision between the two continents of Tarimsky and Kirghiz-Kazakh. This collision was caused because of their askew convergence when the paleoceanic basin closed.

Examples 
The examples below are condensed in order to portray a brief overview of several paleocontinents.

Gondwana

Location 
Gondwana was located in the southern hemisphere, with the land mass that makes up current day Antarctica closest to the South Pole. The continent reaches from just above the equator to the South Pole. Current day South America and Africa are closest to the equator with Northern Africa intersecting the equator.

Time period 
600-180 mya, Precambrian - Jurassic Period.

Formation 
Gondwana was made of present-day South America, Africa, Arabia, India, Antarctica, Australia, and Madagascar. The Continent was fully formed by the late Precambrian period. This was 600 million years ago. It was an amalgamation of all the current southern hemisphere continents. Gondwana lasted through many different time periods and was a part of other super continents, like Pangea.

Demise 
Gondwana broke up in distinct stages. The continent started to split during the Jurassic Period around 180 million years ago. The first event was the separation of the western half of Gondwana, which includes Africa and South America, from the eastern half, which includes Antarctica, Australia, Madagascar, and India. Next, 40 million years later, South America and Africa began to split which began to open up the Atlantic Ocean. Also around this time India and Madagascar began to detach from Australia and Antarctica. This separation created the Indian Ocean. Lastly, in the Cretaceous, India and Madagascar began to split and Australia and Antarctica began to detach from one another.

Life 
The life on Gondwana has changed throughout its existence. Gondwana was a smaller piece of Rodinia and stayed together all the way through the breakup of Pangea. This allowed Gondwana to host almost all species that have ever lived on Earth. Gondwana also was a part of some great mass extinction events. During the Ordovician, sea levels rose so much that the entire Gondwana continent was covered, at this time marine life was dominant. Also, vertebrates started to make an appearance in the fossil record. Terrestrial species started to become more prominent in the Silurian, however, in the Devonian modern fish and shark species began to diversify, and terrestrial vegetation begun colonizing the continent, as organic soil accumulation can be detected. Amniotic eggs started to evolve as more terrestrial land became available with rising land masses and lowering sea levels. During the Permian extinction, almost all marine species were lost, along with some terrestrial species. This event gave rise to terrestrial species, such as reptiles, dinosaurs, and small mammals.

Climate 
Gondwana experienced a variety of climates as it has been a land mass from 600 million years ago in the Precambrian to the Early Jurassic with the breakup of Pangea. In the Cambrian, there was a warmer and milder climate because most continental crust was closer to the equator and not the poles. The continent endured an ice age during the Ordovician period and deglaciation was still occurring during the Silurian period. The climate started to become more humid and tropical throughout the globe and there was a lack of seasonality. The climate began to change again during the Mesozoic, this time period was dominated by a very large and lengthy monsoon season, because of Pangea. Once Pangea began to break apart the climate started to cool, but Gondwana was already being broken apart.

Laurentia

Location 
The location of Laurentia has changed throughout time. In the late Proterozoic Laurentia could be found surrounded by Siberia, South Africa, Australia-Antarctica, and Amazonia-Baltica.  During the time of supercontinent Gondwana, Laurentia was smashed in between Eastern and Western Gondwana, but when Gondwana attached to Laurussia to form Pangea, Laurentia moved and was closer to northern Africa.

Time period 
4 bya-present day, Precambrian-Quaternary.

Formation 
Laurentia is the North American craton. It is one of the largest and oldest cratons dating back to Precambrian times. The craton itself includes the Canadian and Greenland shields, as well as the interior basin of North America, and the craton can also include the Cordilleran foreland of the Southwestern United States. The craton itself formed in deep time, the early Proterozoic age of the Earth and has stayed coherent since. It formed through many different orogenies and the suture zones that they create. These smaller land masses were made of Archean age crust and belts of Early Proterozoic island arcs. Laurentia has been a part of many supercontinents throughout its time. The formation of Laurentia is similar to the formation of Eurasia.

Demise 
Laurentia is presently still coherent and still a continental craton. Now, it goes by the name North America. The craton can be found stretching from Alberta, Canada to the Eastern coast of both Canada and the United States. The craton stretches from the south eastern United States to Greenland. The western border of Laurentia can be found on the eastern side of the Rocky Mountains.

Life 
Sea level rose in the Cambrian period which gave rise to marine invertebrates which flourished with the rise in sea level. Life in the Ordovician continued to be dominated by marine animals and vegetation. Also, vertebrates started to make up a portion of the animals on Earth. However sponges and algae were still the most dominant species type. Marine animals were the most dominant but terrestrial species started to appear at the end of the Ordovician. Life in the Silurian was still dominated by marine species but terrestrial species are much more prominent than they had been previously. When Laurentia moved into the Devonian period fish began to diversify and life had begun colonizing land as this is when organic soil accumulation can be detected. More modern fish began to develop as time went on, with the addition of shark diversification. Also, amniotic eggs started to evolve as more terrestrial land became available with rising land masses. The next event was the Permian extinction where almost all species in the oceans died off along with many terrestrial species. This then gave rise to terrestrial animals, such as reptiles, dinosaurs, and small mammals. At the end of this new era was a mass extinction of Dinosaurs and reptiles, this led mammals to flourish as they could take over many of the niches that became vacant.

Climate 
Laurentia experienced a variety of climates as it has been a land mass for billions of years. The craton experienced an ice age during the late Proterozoic and another during the Ordivician period. During the Cambrian, there was no ice age and it was slightly warmer as most continents avoided the poles giving land at this time a milder climate. Deglaciation was still occurring during the Silurian period after the ice age of the Ordovician. The climate started to move to become more humid and tropical throughout the Earth. There were not many seasons. The climate began to change when Laurentia entered the Mesozoic Era, this time period was dominated by a very large and lengthy monsoon season, because of Pangea. At the end of the Cretaceous, seasons started to return and the Earth entered another ice age type event.

Pangea

Location 
The continent spanned from 85° N to 90° S. Pangea was centered over the equator, and encompassed area from the North to the South poles.  The Southeastern part of present-day North America and the Northern region of current day Africa intersected the equator. Present-day Eastern Asia was furthest North and Antarctica and Australia were furthest South.

Time period 
299–272 mya to 200 mya, Early Permian-Early Jurassic.

Formation 
Pangea was created by the continent of Gondwanaland and the continent of Laurussia. During the Carboniferous period the two continents came together to form the supercontinent of Pangea. The mountain building events that happened at this time created the Appalachian Mountains and the Variscan Belt of Central Europe. However, not all landmasses on Earth had attached themselves onto Pangea. It took until the late Permian until the Siberian land mass collided with Pangea. The only land mass to not be a part of Pangea were the former North and South China plates, they created a much smaller land mass in the ocean. There was a massive ocean that encompassed the world called Panthalassa, because most of the continental crust was sutured together into one giant continent there was a giant ocean to match.

Demise 
Pangea broke apart after 70 million years. The supercontinent was torn apart through fragmentation, which is where parts of the main landmass would break off in stages.  There were two main events that led to the dispersal of Pangea. The first was a passive rifting event that occurred in the Triassic period. This rifting event caused the Atlantic Ocean to form. The other event was an active rifting event. This happened in the Lower Jurassic and caused the opening of the Indian Ocean. This breakup took 17 million years to complete.

Life 
Pangea formed roughly 20 million years before the Permian Extinction. During the Permian Extinction over 95% of all marine species were lost and 70% of terrestrial species were lost. The Triassic period of Pangea became a time of recovery from the Permian Extinction. This recovery included the rise of sea levels which created extensive shallow oceanic shelves for large marine reptiles. This recovery period was when terrestrial animals flourished and when land reptiles diversified and flourished, along with the appearance of Dinosaurs. These Dinosaurs would become what characterizes the life forms of the following periods, the Jurassic and Cretaceous. Lastly at the end of the Triassic and the beginning of the Jurassic was the first appearance of small shrew like mammals that came from reptiles.

Climate
The main characteristic of Pangea's climate is that its position on Earth was advantageous for starting a cycle of megamonsoonal circulation. The monsoons reached their maximum strength in the Triassic period of the Mesozoic. During the late Carboniferous, there was peat formation in what is currently Europe and the Eastern areas of North America. The wetter, swamp like conditions needed to form peat were contrasted with the dry conditions on the Colorado Plateau. Nearing the end of the Carboniferous the region of Pangea centered on the equator became drier. In the Permian, this dryness was contrasted with seasonal rainfall, and this type of climate became more normal and widespread on the continent. However, during the Triassic, the Colorado Plateau started to regain some moisture and there was a shift in wind direction. Around the same time parts of current day Australia that were found at higher latitudes were much drier and seasonal in character. At the start of the Jurassic the megamonsoon started to fall apart as drying started to happen to Gondwana and the southern portion of Laurasia.

Rodinia

Location 
Rodinia was centered on the Equator and reached from 60° N to 60° S.

Time period 
1.2-1 bya to 800-850 mya, Proterozoic Eon - end of Precambrian.

Formation 
It was the first supercontinent to form on Earth, all the continental crust on Earth came together and formed one giant land mass. This land mass was surrounded by an even larger ocean, known as Mirovia. There were about four smaller continents that collided and came together to form Rodinia. This event is called the Grenville Orogeny. This caused there to be mountain building along the areas of were continents collided. This is because the continental crust is not very dense so neither continent would sink or sub duct. This causes the formation of Fold and Thrust belts, similar to the Himalayas today.

Demise 
Rodinia lasted for 250 mya and then began to come apart between 850 and 800 mya. The continent began to break part at a single point but then fractured and ripped open in three different directions. Two of the three rifts that were created were successful and the third failed. The breaking up Rodinia caused the formation of Gondwana or Gondwanaland and Laurentia. Rodinia's breakup created many shallow coastal shelves that were not there before. The shelves were nutrient rich and this is thought to have led to the diversification of vegetative and non-vegetative life on Earth. The shelves in particular were the area where animal life is said to have started. The name Rodinia also alludes to this, in Russian it means ‘to give birth’ and in this case that is to animal life here on Earth.

Climate 
The climate at the end of Rodinia's existence was cold and it is thought that this was the start of the first snowball Earth period. Rodinia already had some glaciation but as it tore apart, less dense rock began to rise causing more land area to be at higher elevations which encouraged more ice to stick. However, the time of Rodinia was a time of inactivity in Earth's atmosphere. Also the atmosphere had little oxygen because Rodinia's land surface was too harsh of an environment for land plants to flourish, the atmosphere was devoid of Oxygen and the ozone layer was much less extensive which attributed to the harsh land environment.

See also

References

Palaeocontinent
Paleogeography
Paleocontinent